Plagiobryum is a genus of mosses belonging to the family Bryaceae. It has a cosmopolitan distribution.

Species
The following species are recognised in the genus Plagiobryum:
Plagiobryum demissum (Hook.) Lindb. 
Plagiobryum duthiei Hedderson & Harold, 1990
Plagiobryum giraldii Paris, 1897
Plagiobryum hultenii Hedderson, 1990
Plagiobryum japonicum Noguchi, 1952
Plagiobryum laxum Demaret & Potier de la Varde, 1944
Plagiobryum novaeseelandiae Brotherus, 1916
Plagiobryum piliferum Potier de la Varde, 1955
Plagiobryum zierii (Dicks. ex Hedw.) Lindb.

References

Bryaceae
Moss genera